Alexia Kourtelesi (born 23 May 1971) is a Greek judoka, who competed in the women's middleweight category. She picked up two Greek senior titles in her own division, and represented her home nation Greece at the 2004 Summer Olympics in Athens.

Kourtelesi qualified for the Greek squad in the women's middleweight class (70 kg) at the 2004 Summer Olympics in Athens, by filling up an entry by the International Judo Federation and the Hellenic Olympic Committee, as Greece received an automatic berth for being the host nation. Kourtelesi received a bye in the opening round, but crashed out early in a defeat to Argentina's Elizabeth Copes by an ippon and an ippon seoi nage (one-arm shoulder throw) two minutes and fifty-six seconds into her first match.

References

External links

Hellenic Judo Federation Bio 

1971 births
Living people
Greek female judoka
Olympic judoka of Greece
Judoka at the 2004 Summer Olympics
Sportspeople from Athens
20th-century Greek women
21st-century Greek women